A sex symbol or icon is a person or character widely considered sexually attractive.

History

The term sex symbol was first used between the 1910s and 1920s to describe the first emerging film stars of the era. One of the first sex symbols on-screen was Sessue Hayakawa for men and Asta Nielsen for women. Movie studios have relied heavily on the looks and sex appeal of their actors to be able to attract audiences. The use of this concept increased during World War II.

In the 20th century, sex symbols could be male as well as female: actors such as the romantic Sessue Hayakawa and the athletic Douglas Fairbanks were popular in the 1910s and 1920s. Archetypal screen lover Rudolph Valentino's death in 1926 caused mass hysteria among his female fans. In Hollywood, many film stars were seen as sex symbols, such as Errol Flynn, Gary Cooper, and Clark Gable. The "bad boy" image of the 1950s was epitomized by sex symbols such as James Dean and Marlon Brando and women like Marilyn Monroe and Jayne Mansfield were seen as the archetype of the blonde bombshell.

While until the 1950s, the sex symbol was just seen as a sexual ideal, in the 1960s it was seen as a symbol of the emancipation of bodies and sexuality with the sexual revolution.

Fictional sex symbols
With regard to fiction, Rotten Tomatoes states that the 1930s cartoon character Betty Boop is "the first and most famous sex symbol on animated screen". Jessica Rabbit (voiced by Kathleen Turner) from the 1988 live-action/animation crossover film Who Framed Roger Rabbit has been described as a sex symbol as well.

Video games have had a few characters that are considered sex symbols; one example would be Lara Croft, who has had several appearances in mainstream media.

See also
 Bombshell (slang)
 Blonde bombshell
 Sex kitten
 Bimbo
 Himbo
 Pin-up model
 Matinée idol
 Sexual objectification

References

Further reading
Donna Leigh-Kile, Sex Symbols, Random House Inc, Aug 28, 1999, 

1950s neologisms
Celebrity fandom

Sexuality and society
Sexuality in popular culture
Symbolism